Carlos Serrey Dávila (26 August 1873 – ?) was an Argentine Conservative politician.

Serrey served as a member of the Argentine Chamber of Deputies and Argentine Senate for his home province of Salta, and was elected to preside both bodies.

Serrey first served as Senator between 1906 and 1907, finishing the term of the deceased Francisco Uriburu. He returned to the Senate in 1925, serving until it was dissolved by the coup of 1943. 

Serrey proposed the 1936 Law 11627, known as the "Serrey Law", which expropriated the historic Cabildo of Salta which was recovered and re-opened as the Historical Museum of the North and declared a National Historical Monument in 1946.

1873 births
Members of the Argentine Senate for Salta
Members of the Argentine Chamber of Deputies elected in Salta
People from Salta Province
Year of death unknown